Ilyes Hamache (born 11 February 2003) is a French professional footballer who plays as a winger for Ligue 2 club Valenciennes.

Club career
Hamache made his professional debut with Valenciennes in a 2–1 Ligue 2 win over Bastia on 21 September 2021. He scored his first goal for the club in a 3–1 loss to Dunkerque on 16 October 2021. On 30 January 2022, he signed his first professional contract with the club, keeping him until 2025.

Personal life
Hamache is of Algerian descent with roots from Ighil Ouantar, a small village in Béjaïa.

References

External links
 
 VAFC Profile
 Ligue 2 profile

2003 births
Living people
Footballers from Lille
French footballers
French sportspeople of Algerian descent
Valenciennes FC players
Ligue 2 players
Association football forwards